Citytv.com.co is a Colombian video sharing website that operates under the Canadian-based brand name Citytv, which is licensed to the Colombian newspaper El Tiempo from Rogers Media. The website was created by El Tiempo Publishing Company (Casa Editorial El Tiempo) in order to compete with other popular video sharing websites such as YouTube and Metacafe with the difference being that it targets a Colombian audience. As of August 2009 the vast majority of videos in the website come from Citytv Bogota's television programming. Users can upload their own videos upon registration or by accessing via Facebook Connect. The website's terms of service warns that videos with improper material such as pornography or defamation are prohibited and that all videos are screened prior to publishing.

Facebook Connect integration
Citytv.com.co is tightly integrated with Facebook by allowing users to post a comment in the website and at the same time having the comment published in their Facebook wall.

See also
 Citytv Bogota
 Citytv
 Comparison of video services
 Internet in Colombia

References

Colombian entertainment websites
Video hosting